The "Raccoon" John Smith House in Owingsville, Kentucky was built in 1839.  It was listed on the National Register of Historic Places in 2012.

It was a home of "Raccoon" John Smith.

It is listed as "address restricted" in the NRIS database, but at 250 W. Main St. in its Inventory/Nomination document. The NRHP nomination document is not publicly available at the National Park Service and is recorded as being "Fully restricted" at NARA.

It has also been known as the J.A.J. Lee House and denoted as BH-0-4.

References

Houses on the National Register of Historic Places in Kentucky
Greek Revival architecture in Kentucky
Houses completed in 1839
National Register of Historic Places in Bath County, Kentucky
1839 establishments in Kentucky